Johan Jensen may refer to:

Johan Jensen (mathematician) (1859–1925), Danish mathematician and engineer
Johan Jensen (boxer) (1898–1983), Danish boxer
Johan Laurentz Jensen (1800–1856), Danish artist